Romilda is a feminine given name which may refer to:

 Romilda of Friuli (died 611), Italian duchess
 Romilda Baldacchino Zarb, Maltese politician
 Romilda Pantaleoni (1847–1917), Italian opera singer
 Romilda Vane, fictional character from Harry Potter

See also 

 Romilar

Feminine given names
English feminine given names
Italian feminine given names